Ramón Luis Conde Román (December 29, 1934 – February 23, 2020) was a professional baseball player from Puerto Rico. Also known as "Wito," he amassed 3,025 base hits in the U.S., the Puerto Rican Winter League, and Mexico. Alas, none of those were in his one brief shot in the majors.

Career
Aged 27, Conde played 14 games for the Chicago White Sox in 1962, primarily as a third baseman. He came to the plate 19 times without a hit, although he did manage three walks.

Conde had an extensive minor league baseball career as well. He began playing in the U.S. in 1954 with the Sioux City Soos of the Western League The 1970 season was his last in the U.S. minors. He amassed 2,045 total hits at various levels, plus 20 more during a brief stretch in Mexico in 1970.

Conde became a coach and scout in Puerto Rico. He also managed in the Mexican League in 1981 and 1986, as well as briefly managing the rookie league Wytheville Cubs in 1985. Of particular note, he became an executive in the PRWL.

Death
Conde died of a heart attack on February 23, 2020, at the age of 85.

See also
 List of Major League Baseball players from Puerto Rico

References

External links

1934 births
2020 deaths
Asheville Tourists players
Chicago White Sox players
Cleveland Indians scouts
Dallas Eagles players
Evansville White Sox players
Indianapolis Indians players
Johnstown Johnnies players
Major League Baseball players from Puerto Rico
Major League Baseball third basemen
Minor league baseball managers
People from Juana Díaz, Puerto Rico
Puerto Rican expatriate baseball players in Mexico
Saraperos de Saltillo players
Sioux City Soos players
Springfield Giants players
Spokane Indians players
Syracuse Chiefs players
Tulsa Oilers (baseball) players
Victoria Rosebuds players